Salig Ram, popularly known by the honorific "Huzur Maharaj" and by the government-conferred title "Rai Bahadur," was born in Peepal Mandi, Agra, on 14 March 1829. He served as chief inspector of post offices in British India, and, in 1881, was Postmaster-General of the North-Western Provinces, based in Allahabad. He was the first Indian to hold the position.

Salig Ram came in contact with his guru, Shiv Dayal Singh, in 1858 in Agra. Salig Ram recognised his guru as the first physical incarnation of the Supreme Being, whom Salig Ram called by the name "Radha Soami." Salig Ram served Shiv Dayal Singh for many years and, after  Shiv Dayal Singh's death, Salig Ram retired from his job, and the Radha Soami sect in Agra took up the role of guru. He died on 6 December 1898.

Successors

Several teaching lineages have descended from Salig Ram. Some of the more prominent are:

The Radha Soami Sect
Located at: Huzuri Bhavan (Huzur's Center), Peepal Mandi, Agra city (now in Uttar Pradesh). This is Salig Ram's home, where his direct descendants conduct Satsang today. The place is also known as Huzuri Samadh which is believed to be a holy place and Satsang takes place every day. The lineage of gurus runs: Salig Ram — Ajudhya Prasad (son of Salig Ram) — Gur Prasad — Agam Prasad Mathur (present guru).

Radha Soami Central Administrative Council
Located at: Soami Bagh, Agra. Lineage: Salig Ram — Brahm Shankar Misra  — Maheshwari Devi ( Buaji Saheba) — Madhav Prasad Sinha.

Dayalbagh Sabha
Located at: Dayalbagh, Agra. Lineage: Salig Ram — Brahm Shankar Misra — Kamta Prasad Sinha — Anand Swarup (founder) — Gurcharan Das Mehta — Mukund Behari Lal — Prem Saran Satsangi.
Dayalbagh was founded by Sir Anand Swarup, Kt.
The present Guru Prem Saran Satsangi is a retired physicist and system scientist of IIT Delhi.
The 200th birth anniversary of Shiv Dayal Singh was celebrated in Dayalbagh from August 2017 to 24 August 2018.

Radha Soami 
Located at: Gopi Ganj, Mirzapur, Uttar Pradesh. Lineage: Salig Ram — Shivbratlal Varman (founder).

Be Man Temple
Located at: Manavta Mandir, Hoshiarpur, Punjab. Lineage: Salig Ram — Shivbratlal Varman — Faqir Chand (founder) — Bhagat Munshi Ram & Ishwar Chandra Sharma.

Radha Soami Satsang, Dinod
Located at: Dinod, Bhiwani, Haryana. Lineage: Salig Rām — Shivbratlal Varman — Ram Singh Arman — Tarachand (founder) — Kanwar Singh.

Books

Salig Ram published "abstracts" of the talks of Shiv Dayal Singh, as well as his own writings. He wrote following books:
Prem Patra Radha Soami (six volumes)
Prem Bani Radha Soami 
Radha Soami Mat Prakash (English)
Radha Soami Mat Sandesh
Radha Soami Mat Upadesh
Sar-Upadesh
Nij-Upadesh
Guru-Upadesh
Jugat Prakash

See also

 Radha Swami Satsang, Dinod
 Maharishi Shiv Brat Lal
 Baba Faqir Chand
 Saligrama (disambiguation)

References

External links
 http://www.radhasoamisatsang.org
http://radhasoamidayal.net/GuruIntro.html
http://eacharya.inflibnet.ac.in/data-server/eacharya-documents/548158e2e41301125fd790cf_INFIEP_72/110/ET/72-110-ET-V1-S1__l_.pdf
http://www.dayalbagh.org.in/

Sant Mat gurus
Surat Shabd Yoga
1829 births
1898 deaths
People from Agra
Indian Civil Service (British India) officers